The Department of Management Studies (DoMS), Indian Institute of Science is a university in Bangalore, India. Established in 1948, it is the oldest management school in India. Two program options are available students who graduated with a degree in engineering; the Master in Management studies and the Ph.D research program.

Courses/Degrees offered
The department presently offers full-time Master of Management program (M.Mgmt) and Phd program. It also offers an External Registration Program (ERP) program for practicing industry professionals. The admission to MBA program is limited to only engineering graduates. They are screened for the program through a rigorous 3 step process starting with an all India level tests CAT/GMAT/GATE followed by group discussion and personal interview. The M.Mgmt batch size is strictly limited to 16.

MBA Program
MBA was offered till 2008. It was organized as a 21-month, four term program. The courses are broadly classified into hard core, soft core and electives. The hard core courses enable students to acquire fundamental skills in various management disciplines, while the soft core and electives are tailor-made to cater to individual interests. In addition to class room teaching there are mandatory industry projects which need to be undertaken. At the end of first year, every student was stipulated to undergo an internship in industry for a minimum period of eight weeks. During fourth semester, students were taking up industrial projects, which usually doubles up as Mmgt thesis project.

From 2011 August, Master of Management Program is offered. The eligibility criteria are same as for the earlier MBA program. Considering the contemporary demands of the society and industry, M.Mgmt course is first of its kind to specialize in Technology Management and Business Analytics. The highly quantitative and technology oriented curriculum nurtures graduate engineers to become competent and socially responsible management leaders in technology intensive and data driven organizations. The rigorous selection process involves shortlisting of nearly 450 students from about 3000 applicants and finally selecting 16 students.

Weekly Seminars
Every Friday, DoMS is graced by stalwarts from the industry who provide the students with insights into their personal & professional life. This is a platform where the leaders of tomorrow interact and learn from those who have redefined the way business is done today. Every seminar focuses on Contemporary Technology Management or Business Analytics problems and delves into solutions relevant to the same.

COSMAR
COSMAR, the Consortium of Students in Management Research, is an annual International Research Consortium organized by the Department of Management Studies, Indian Institute of Science, Bangalore. COSMAR began as the National Doctoral Consortium (NDC) in 2000 and has since then evolved into its present form. COSMAR has always been a purely not-for-profit student-driven academic event.

Over its previous editions, COSMAR has attracted some of the best research in management and allied disciplines from institutions of high repute and academic standing from all over the country such as the Indian Institutes of Management [IIMs], the Indian Institutes of Technology [IITs], the National Institutes of Technology [NITs], Indian Statistical Institute [ISI], Indian Institute of Science [IISc], Institute of Rural Management Anand [IRMA], Jawaharlal Nehru University [JNU], Management Development Institute [MDI] Gurgaon, Indira Gandhi Institute of Development Research [IGIDR], Xavier Labour Relations Institute [XLRI] Jamshedpur, Xavier Institute of Management [XIM] Bhubaneswar, and Institute for Social and Economic Change [ISEC], to name a few.

References

External links
 Department of Management Studies IISc Official Website

Business schools in Bangalore
Indian Institute of Science